Nandrolone propionate (brand names Anabolicus, Nor-Anabol, Nortesto, Norybol-19, Pondus, Testobolin), or nandrolone propanoate, also known as 19-nortestosterone 17β-propionate, is a synthetic androgen and anabolic steroid and nandrolone ester that is or has been marketed in Spain.

See also
 List of androgen esters § Nandrolone esters

References

Androgens and anabolic steroids
Nandrolone esters
Progestogens
Propionate esters